Pioneer Mountains may refer to:

 Pioneer Mountains (Idaho)
 Pioneer Mountains (Montana)